Louis Johannes Conradie (born ) is a South African rugby union player for Otago who plays in the NZ Mitre10 CupOtago Rugby. His regular position is lock.

References

South African rugby union players
Living people
1996 births
Rugby union players from Pretoria
Rugby union locks
Free State Cheetahs players
Peñarol Rugby players
Otago rugby union players
Urayasu D-Rocks players
Blue Bulls players
Toyota Verblitz players